Kolekole Beach Park is a Hawaii county park on the island of Hawaii. , it is currently closed due to lead contamination found in the soil of the lawn areas. It will remain closed as further testing is done.

The stream  passes through a rainforest containing several varieties of orchids.

The Hawaii Belt Road (state route 19) passes over the park on a high bridge.
The park is located in the South Hilo District at coordinates  near the 14 mile marker.

The name Kolekole means "raw or scarred" in the Hawaiian language. Camping is allowed with a permit.

It provides the only major road between the town of Hilo and the Hāmākua district. It was originally built as a railroad bridge for sugarcane trains, but after the 1946 tsunami the railroad was abandoned and the bridge rebuilt for automobiles. E. Claude Moore was the County Engineer who designed and executed the plan to use the old railroad bridges to span the ravines for the Hawaii belt road. Claude Moore was a World War II veteran of the U.S. Army Corps of Engineers. He attended Iowa State College and worked for the Iowa Highway Commission prior to World War II. After the stint as County Engineer, Claude Moore worked as a Civil Engineer for C Brewer Company. He designed many subdivisions on the island, and was a long time Scout leader and Director of what is now HFS Credit Union.

References

Protected areas of Hawaii (island)
Parks in Hawaii
Beaches of Hawaii (island)